The cuneiform pa sign, (as Sumerogram, PA), has many uses in both the 14th century BC Amarna letters and the Epic of Gilgamesh. It is routinely and commonly used to spell the Akkadian language word "pānu", face, presence, and with a preposition (ex. ana pānu), before. In the photo of the obverse of EA 364, it is used to spell Akkadian "eperu", 'dust', (EA 364, lines 7,8: "...and (ù dust (IŠ (Sumerogram)=dust)) and (u)\ dust "-(a-pa-ru). (The two "and"-s are u-(no. 3), then u-(no. 1)-(u (cuneiform))(the bottom half).)

The alphabetic/syllabic uses and Sumerograms of the 'pa' sign from the Epic of Gilgamesh:

hat
pa
PA (Sumerogram)s
SÀG

Its usage numbers from the Epic of Gilgamesh are as follows: hat-(21), pa-(209), PA-(11), SÀG-(1). In the Amarna letters the start of "messenger Xxxxx" is often spelled in cuneiform characters: "LÚ.PA.X.y.z" (etc.), (LÚ the beginning determinative for Man).

References

Moran, William L. 1987, 1992. The Amarna Letters. Johns Hopkins University Press, 1987, 1992. 393 pages.(softcover)
 Parpola, 1971. The Standard Babylonian Epic of Gilgamesh, Parpola, Simo, Neo-Assyrian Text Corpus Project, c 1997, Tablet I thru Tablet XII, Index of Names, Sign List, and Glossary-(pp. 119–145), 165 pages.

Cuneiform signs